Jack Taylor (1948–2008) was a pioneer freestyle skier and 3x consecutive world mogul champion, having won in 1975, 1976, and 1977.

Education
Jack was a 1966 graduate of Portsmouth High School in Portsmouth, New Hampshire, and a 1970 graduate of the University of New Hampshire.

References

1948 births
2008 deaths
American male freestyle skiers
University of New Hampshire alumni
People from Portsmouth, New Hampshire
Sportspeople from Rockingham County, New Hampshire